Joe Capilano (c. 1854–1910), also known as Capiano Joe, was a leader of the Squamish from 1895-1910,  who called him Sa7plek (Sahp-luk). He fought for the recognition of native rights and lifestyle.

He spent his youth fishing and hunting and was famous for fighting against the wildly invading Lekwiltok warriors from the Kwakwaka'wakw Territory. He went to work in the sawmill at Moodyville, a pioneer settlement in what is now the Lower Lonsdale area of the city of North Vancouver.

In 1906 he, along with Cowichan Chief Charley Isipaymilt and Secwepemc Chief Basil David, traveled to Ottawa, then after that London, to meet with King of Canada Edward VII to speak of the need to settle land claims in British Columbia, also, the Chief asked for the ban against potlatches to be lifted. Joe Capilano died of tuberculosis in 1910.

Legacy 
A number of landmarks on Vancouver's North Shore share his name, which in the original Skwxwu7mesh snichim is Giyeplénexw, approximately Kiapilanough, where "Kiap" is the name of a hereditary chieftaincy and "-lanough" means "people of"; his formal title in that language is TE Kiapila'noq.  Among these, in addition to Capilano Indian Reserve No. 5 (Xwemelch'stn, historically anglicized as Homulchesan), are the Capilano River, Capilano Lake, one of the sources of Vancouver's water supply, and Capilano Mountain, which lies at the head of the river's drainage basin.  Capilano Road, a major arterial road, takes its name from its course along the east side of the river from the Capilano Reserve up to base of the airtram up to the Grouse Mountain ski resort.  Capilano Road's intersection with Marine Drive immediately east of the northern ramps of the Lions Gate Bridge. Capilano University, opened September 10, 1968 in North Vancouver is named after him, after being selected from submissions made by North Shore residents. The neighbourhood of North Vancouver around the upper end of Capilano Road is Capilano Highlands.

"Legends of Vancouver", a  collection of Coast Salish, particularly Squamish, stories by Pauline Johnson, a Canadian poet of Mohawk origin, was based on Capilano's tales.

See also 
 Capilano (disambiguation)
 Dan George
 History of Squamish and Tsleil-Waututh longshoremen, 1863-1963
 August Jack Khatsahlano
 Xwemelch'stn

Footnotes

Bibliography 
 Barman, Jean. Stanley Park's Secrets. Harbour Publishing, 2005. .
 
 E. Johnson, Pauline. Legends of Vancouver. IndyPublish.com (March 28, 2005). .

External links 

1850s births
1910 deaths
19th-century First Nations people
20th-century First Nations people
Indigenous leaders in British Columbia
Industrial Workers of the World members
People from North Vancouver
Squamish people (individuals)